Abora is the name of an ancestral solar deity of La Palma (Canary Islands) and a traditional god of the Guanches.

Supreme being
Abora (Ibru) is the name of the supreme being of the religion of the Guanches on the island of La Palma. In Guanche mythology of the island of Tenerife, the supreme god was called Achamán.

Uses of the name
Reed boats Abora of the German explorer Dominique Görlitz

References

Guanche deities
Solar gods